Stagecoach Express is a 1942 American Western film directed by George Sherman and written by Arthur V. Jones. The film stars Don "Red" Barry, Lynn Merrick, Al St. John, Robert Kent, Emmett Lynn and Guy Kingsford. The film was released on March 6, 1942, by Republic Pictures.

Plot

Cast

References

External links
 

1942 films
1942 Western (genre) films
American black-and-white films
American Western (genre) films
1940s English-language films
Films directed by George Sherman
Films shot in Los Angeles
Republic Pictures films
1940s American films